Santhosh Kumaran (born 3 April 1998) is an Indian cricketer. He made his first-class debut for Puducherry in the 2018–19 Ranji Trophy on 14 December 2018. He made his Twenty20 debut for Puducherry in the 2018–19 Syed Mushtaq Ali Trophy on 21 February 2019.

References

External links
 

1998 births
Living people
Indian cricketers
Pondicherry cricketers
Place of birth missing (living people)